The Louros is a river in the Epirus region, in northwestern Greece. It emerges from the ground in a large spring located immediately north of the village of Vouliasta, in Ioannina regional unit. It flows south through a canyon, and then a dam followed by a hydroelectric power station. The Louros flows past town of Filippiada, forming the boundary between Arta regional unit and Preveza regional unit. The river then veers east into the Preveza regional unit, flowing through the municipality of Louros, named after the river. The Louros then empties into the marshes at the northern end of the Ambracian Gulf.

With Strymon river, Louros is one of only two rivers in the world where the critically endangered Greek lamprey (Caspiomyzon hellenicus) has been found.

References

Epirus
Rivers of Greece
Landforms of Ioannina (regional unit)
Rivers of Epirus (region)
Landforms of Arta (regional unit)
Landforms of Preveza (regional unit)
Drainage basins of the Ionian Sea